The 1994 Asian Games (also known as the XII Asiad), was a multi-sport event held in Hiroshima, Japan from 2 to 16 October 1994. They were the first Asian Games to be held in a non-capital city. The main theme of this edition was to promote peace and harmony among Asian nations. It was emphasized by the host because the venue was the site of the first atomic bomb attack in 1945. A total of 6,828 athletes from 42 National Olympic Committees (NOCs) participated in these games, competing in 34 sports. Baseball, Karate, Modern Pentathlon and Soft tennis were included for the first time. This medal table ranks the participating NOCs by the number of gold medals won by their athletes.

Athletes from 32 participating NOCs won at least one medal; athletes from 20 of these NOCs secured at least one gold. Athletes from China won 125 gold medals, the most of any nation at these Asiad. Host nation Japan finished second in total medals. South Korea finished third in total medals. Kazakhstan, which participated for the first time, finished fourth.

Medal table
The ranking in this table is consistent with Olympic Council of Asia convention in its published medal tables. By default, the table is ordered by the number of gold medals the athletes from a nation have won (in this context, a nation is an entity represented by a National Olympic Committee). The number of silver medals is taken into consideration next and then the number of bronze medals. If nations are still tied, equal ranking is given; they are listed alphabetically by IOC country code.

Changes in medal standings

References

Original medal table

External links
Official Website of the Olympic Council of Asia

1994 Asian Games
Asian Summer Games medal tables